Carlos Fonseca (1936–1976) was a Nicaraguan politician, teacher and librarian who founded the Sandinista National Liberation Front.

Carlos Fonseca may also refer to:
 Carlos Fonseca (football manager) (born 1981), Spanish football manager
 Carlos Fonseca (footballer, born 1985), Portuguese football goalkeeper
 Carlos Fonseca (footballer, born 1987), Portuguese footballer for FC Tobol 
 Carlos Fonseca (boxer) (born 1955), boxer from Brazil
 Carlos Esteban Fonseca, Puerto Rican television actor